Lealataua County is a county in the Western District in American Samoa.

Demographics

Lealataua County was first recorded beginning with the 1912 special census. Regular decennial censuses were taken beginning in 1920.

Villages
Afao (including Atauloma)
Amaluia
'Āmanave
Asili
Fagaili'i
Fagamalo
Agagulu
Failolo
Leone
Poloa
Nua
Seetaga

Landmarks

Atauloma Girls School, in Atauloma
Cape Taputapu National Natural Landmark, westernmost point on Tutuila Island
Fagalele Boys School: May be the oldest building on Tutuila Island.
Leone Congregational Christian Church (Siona), church in Leone with a historic monument dedicated to John Williams
Leone Falls, waterfall in Leone
Leone Healing Garden, in Leone
Mauga o Alii (Mountain of Chiefs), in Leone
Palagi Beach, beach in 'Āmanave
Poloa Defensive Fortifications, in Poloa
Tataga-Matau Fortified Quarry Complex, in Leone

References 

 

Populated places in American Samoa